Southern Sun is a South African multinational hospitality company headquartered in Johannesburg, South Africa and listed on the Johannesburg Stock Exchange (JSE). The group was founded in 1969 by hotelier Sol Kerzner and South African Breweries. Between 2012 and April 2022 the group was known as Tsogo Sun. Southern Sun owns and operates over 90 hotels in South Africa, Zambia, Mozambique, Seychelles, and the Middle East. In addition to hotels, the group operates conferencing venues including Sandton Convention Centre in Sandton, food and beverage outlets, and spas.

History 
Southern Sun Hotels was formed in 1969 through a partnership between hotel magnate Sol Kerzner and South African Breweries Limited. At the time, Southern Sun Hotels was the largest hotel group in the Southern Hemisphere. The group started with six hotels including the Beverly Hills hotel in uMhlanga, Durban.

In 1983 the group split, with the casino operations becoming Sun International, and the hotels remaining as Southern Sun. In 1985 the group acquired the Holiday Inn South Africa hotel group. This expanded operations from 27 to 50 hotels throughout the country. Between 1985 and 1990 the group became one of the largest fanchisees of Holiday Inn, Crowne Plaza, Holiday Inn Garden Court, and Express by Holiday Inn brands. During the 1990s the group expanded beyond South Africa. Hotels were opened and acquired in the Seychelles, Lusaka, Maputo, Dar es Salaam, and Nairobi.

In 1991 Southern Sun delisted from the JSE to become a wholly owned subsidiary of South African Breweries. In the same year Southern Sun entered into a joint venture with Accor SA to develop the Formula 1 and Formula Inn hotel brands in South Africa. In 1995 Tsogo Sun Holdings was constituted as a bidding consortium between Southern Sun and numerous black empowerment partners to form Tsogo Sun Gaming. In the same year the group entered into an agreement with InterContinental Hotels & Resorts to operate three hotels in South Africa. In 1999 Southern Sun acquired a 50% interest in a consortium with Liberty Group Limited (‘Liberty’) called The Cullinan Hotel Proprietary Limited (‘Cullinan’) which owned three hotels.

In 2000 the group opened the Sandton Convention Centre, one of the largest privately opened convention centres of its kind. In 2002 the group restructured resulting in Tsogo Sun having 51% black ownership from various empowerment consortiums with the balance of the shares owned by SABMiller. Subsequent to this, Hoskens Consolidated Investments (HCI) became the largest shareholder of the group. In 2005 the group rebranded several hotels to Southern Sun Hotels, Garden Court and StayEasy. The group also opened the first SunSquare branded property in the same year.

Between 2009 and 2011 the group acquired Blackrock Casino and the Caledon Casino, Hotel and Spa. A merger with Gold Reef Resorts Limited incorporated an additional seven casinos in the groups portfolio. In 2012 the group undertook a reverse listing on JSE to consolidate the casino businesses and Southern Sun Hotels under one brand, Tsogo Sun. In 2013 the group acquired Accor SA's holding in Formula 1 hotels and rebranded them to SUN1. The group also completed the consolidation of the 734 room Southern Sun Elangeni & Maharani hotel and invested $70 million into the Southern Sun Ikoyi hotel in Lagos, Nigeria.

In 2014, after 45 years, SABMiller disposed of its stake in the group and the investment was placed in the local and international market. Southern Sun Abu Dhabi opened in the same year. In 2015 construction began on the 500 room SunSquare and StayEasy hotel complex in the Cape Town City Bowl. In 2016 the group began managing Crowne Plaza Rosebank and Holiday Inn Sandton. In June 2019 the business unbundled into separate hotel and gaming interests. This resulted in Tsogo Sun Hotels (now Southern Sun) and Tsogo Sun Gaming being separately listed on the JSE. In February 2022 Hospitality Property Fund delisted from the JSE and became a wholly owned subsidiary of Tsogo Sun Hotels.

In May 2022 Tsogo Sun Hotels rebranded back to Southern Sun and in August of the same year the JSE listing changed to SSU completing the rebranding process.

Brands 
Southern Sun operates six hotel brands and eight individually branded luxury properties.

 Individually Branded Luxury Properties: 54 on Bath, Arabella Hotel, Golf & Spa, Beverly Hills, InterContinental Johannesburg O.R. Tambo Airport, Sandton Sun, Sandton Towers, Mount Grace Hotel & Spa, and Paradise Sun. 
 Southern Sun Hotels are a full service group of properties. These properties are 4-star graded properties.
 Southern Sun Resorts are a collection of holiday resorts in locations near the Kruger National Park, uMhlanga Rocks, the central Drakensberg and Plettenberg Bay. These resorts include timeshare accommodation. 
 SunSquare are full service properties in urban locations. 
 Garden Court is a mid-tier brand widely located in South Africa and in one location in Kitwe, Zambia. 
 StayEasy are a budget brand with a focus on business travel. 
 SUN1 are focused at budget travellers with rooms designed for three sharing.

Notable Properties 
  

Beverly Hills - South Africa's first five star property is located at 1 Lighthouse Road in uMhlanga, KwaZulu-Natal. In 2014 the hotel commemorated being in operation for 50 years.

Arabella Hotel, Golf & Spa - The property was added to the Southern Sun group in April 2020. The property is located in the Kogelberg Biosphere, a UNESCO World Heritage Site.

Southern Sun Elangeni & Maharani - The hotel on Durban's Golden Mile has 734 rooms, making it the largest hotel (by number of rooms) in South Africa.

South Africa's second largest hotel (by number of rooms) is the Southern Sun Waterfront hotel in Cape Town.

Paradise Sun - The only resort on Côte d’Or Beach on Praslin island in the Seychelles.

Sandton Sun & Towers - In 2022 Southern Sun rebranded the InterContinental Sandton Towers Hotel to Sandton Towers. The two properties offer a combined 557 rooms. Sandton Towers uniquely has direct access to the Sandton Convention Centre, and Sandton Sun is the only hotel on Sandton Sun's Diamond Walk.

Beacon Island – Located in Plettenberg Bay this resort is one of South Africa's longest running hotels. The property is notable for its architecture inspired by Frank Lloyd Wright's Guggenheim museum design. In 2022 the property commemorated 50 Years of operation.

Sandton Convention Centre 
The Sandton Convention Centre is one of South Africa's largest multi-purpose event and conference venues. The centre has 22,000m2 over seven storeys, and can host up to 10,000 visitors. Since opening in 2000 it has hosted events such as Miss World, the Arnold Classic South Africa, and FIFA World Congress.

References

External links

Southern Sun Website

Companies based in Johannesburg
Companies listed on the Johannesburg Stock Exchange
Hospitality companies of South Africa